Mount Jagungal or sometimes Jagungal, Big Bogong, The Big Bogong Nr., or The Big Bogong Mountain, is a mountain within the Jagungal Wilderness Area of the Kosciuszko National Park in the Snowy Mountains region of New South Wales, Australia.

Since it stands alone in an extensive plain Mount Jagungal is visible for many kilometres in all directions. Similarly, there is an excellent view from the top in all directions.

The Jagungal Wilderness Area is a large wilderness region north of the Main Range. Within this area there is some excellent alpine walking in summer and cross-country skiing in winter. As about 70% of the region is open grassland, it is possible to walk almost anywhere. The Alpine Hut, near Mount Jagungal was built in 1939 to cater for skiers. Access was arduous - via packhorse and ski. It burnt down in 1979.

Gallery

See also

 List of mountains in New South Wales
Skiing in Australia

References

External links
 John Chapmans BushWalking Web Page

Snowy Mountains
Mountains of New South Wales